Nyamwezi may refer to:
 Nyamwezi people
 Nyamwezi language

Language and nationality disambiguation pages